Bad Day is an independent British film starring Claire Goose, Donna Air, Sarah Harding, Anthony Ofoegbu and Robbie Gee. It is the latest feature film from director Ian David Diaz, whose past films include The Killing Zone, Dead Room and Fallen Angels.

Synopsis
Rebecca Ryan has a bad day.

Cast
Rebecca Ryan/Margaret – Claire Goose
Abby Barrett – Donna Air
Darius Cruise – Anthony Ofoegbu
Harry McCann – George Calil
Marla McCann – Riana Husselmann
Trigg – Tom Bacon
David Cummings – Keith Eyles
Benjamin Radcliffe – Robbie Gee
Jade Jennings – Sarah Harding
Aaron White – Marlon Sage Kerr
Triftan Jarret – Dominic Debias
Mr. Ward – Ben Shockley
Mrs. Ward – Sadie Tonk
Lynn Ryan – Olivia Glynn-Jones

Production notes
Although incorrectly described in the British Films Catalogue as having been shot on 35mm film, Bad Day was in fact one of the first independent feature films shot entirely in the UK using the Panasonic AG-HVX200 P2 camera.
Notably this was the first acting performance in a feature film from Sarah Harding of the popular UK girl band Girls Aloud. Owing to release schedules her subsequent appearance in St Trinian's 2: The Legend of Fritton's Gold was released to the public before Bad Day.
When it was decided that Sarah Harding's character in the film should have long, dark hair a wig was used to cover her distinctive short blonde crop.
The visual FX supervisor for Bad Day had previously worked on The Da Vinci Code, commenting that the number of individual FX shots he completed on Bad Day exceeded those on this previous film. SVFX included greenscreen driving scenes, muzzle flash and squib/wound/blood enhancements, mic/wire removal, digital scene enhancements and day-for-night image manipulation.
 The original score was composed by Dominic Glynn who is best known for his work on the TV series Doctor Who.

Reception
Bad Day was released as a direct-to-video release on DVD and Blu-ray in the UK.

References

External links
 
 Bad Day on Facebook

2010 direct-to-video films
British direct-to-video films
British drama films
2010s English-language films
Films shot in London
British independent films
2010 drama films
2010 independent films
2010s British films